Phare Lake is a lake in Renville County in the U.S. state of Minnesota.

Phare Lake bears the name of a pioneer settler.

References

Lakes of Minnesota
Lakes of Renville County, Minnesota